Michele Moroni (born 23 August 1994) is an Italian football player. He plays for Serie D club Fiorenzuola.

Club career
He made his Serie C debut for Gubbio on 8 September 2013 in a game against Perugia.

On 17 August 2018, Santarcangelo announced that Moroni will join them in Serie D on permanent basis, after playing for them in the previous Serie C season on loan.

In January 2020, Moroni moved to Borgo San Donnino FC. He then joined U.S. Fiorenzuola 1922 S.S. in August 2020.

References

External links
 
 

1994 births
Sportspeople from Parma
Living people
Italian footballers
Italy youth international footballers
Crociati Noceto players
Parma Calcio 1913 players
A.S. Gubbio 1910 players
U.S. Cremonese players
S.S. Maceratese 1922 players
Santarcangelo Calcio players
U.S. Fiorenzuola 1922 S.S. players
Serie C players
Serie D players
Association football midfielders
Footballers from Emilia-Romagna